The Boston University College of Engineering (ENG) is the engineering school of Boston University. It offers undergraduate and postgraduate degrees in various engineering fields.

History 

College of Engineering
Educational institutions established in 1950
Engineering schools and colleges in the United States
Engineering universities and colleges in Massachusetts
Universities and colleges in Boston
1950 establishments in Massachusetts